Monkswood Valley is a 30.7-hectare biological Site of Special Scientific Interest (SSSI) near the village of Cold Ashton, South Gloucestershire, notified in 1990.

Monkswood Reservoir, built in 1896 and now owned by Wessex Water, is situated in the valley of the SSSI. The SSSI is woodland and grassland on the sloping land north and south of the reservoir and its tributary.

The woodlands contain Fraxinus excelsior  Acer campestre  Mercurialis perennis (Ashfield MapleDog's Mercury) areas, which has limited distribution in Great Britain.

The SSSI has four areas: Monk Woods, Hunterwick Wood & Hartley Wood, Frys Farm and Valley. St. Catherine's Valley SSSI is immediately to the north-east.

The GloucestershireSomerset border runs through the reservoir and SSSI. The SSSI is adjacent to the Limestone Link long-distance footpath.

References

External links
Monkswood Valley SSSI, 
}

Sites of Special Scientific Interest in Avon
Bath and North East Somerset
South Gloucestershire District
Sites of Special Scientific Interest notified in 1990